The King Shaka Regiment (formerly the Durban Regiment) is a reserve motorised infantry battalion of the South African Army.

History

Origin
Established in 1923 as the Durban Volunteer Guides, the unit was disbanded after World War Two but reformed on paper in 1959 as an armoured infantry unit.

Durban Regiment was officially proclaimed in 1959 and the first posting to the unit was on 1 January 1960 with Colonel M.B. Williams  as its first officer commanding.

Internal operations
The Regiment's first mobilisations were on 31 March 1960 to combat unrest in Natal's Cato Manor area. They were, in fact, the first regiment mobilised and committed to this action.

On 31 May 1961 the unit was again mobilised for participation in the ceremonies accompanying the Declaration of the Republic of South Africa.

Type conversion
First formed as an armoured infantry regiment, the Durban Regiment was later converted to motorised infantry.

The regiment received its Regimental Colours on 10 October 1964.

Language
In 1969, the Durban Regiment was instructed to transfer all Afrikaans speaking unit members to a newly formed unit, Regiment Port Natal (RPN).

Band
As from the formal inauguration of the unit, authority was acquired for the formation of a military band that functioned to support the unit at military functions and parades. In 1976 the Montclair Pipe band (a civilian band) affiliated to the military band and over a very short time the pipe 
contingent absorbed the bugles and trumpets of the military band. The Durban Regiment Pipe Band now forms the musical component at the unit and effectively supports the unit at military functions and parades.

Training
Annual training camps were completed every year until 1972 when Durban Regiment began duties on either the South West Africa (Namibia) or Mozambique borders during the South African Border War. In addition to the border duties, from 1982, Durban Regiment also became involved in counter insurgency operations in urban operations in urban areas, mainly in the Kwa-Zulu Natal area.

Freedom of the City
On its 21st birthday in 1981, the Durban Regiment was granted the freedom of the City of Durban.

Garrison
In 1999 the Durban Regiment moved headquarters to the Drill Hall at the Old Fort Road Military Base in Durban.

Post 1994 and the SANDF

Peacekeeping deployments
The first volunteer camp was held in the Boshoek training area near Ladysmith for two weeks in February 1995. The first member of colour volunteer to do service as guard duties was in August 1995. The same member served as an officer with the first army conventional reserve force company to deploy externally to the Democratic Republic of the Congo for peace support operations.

In January 2005, Durban Regiment contributed 20 members (one officer, 6 NCOs and thirteen riflemen) to the Reserve Force company that deployed with 7 South African Infantry Battalion to the DRC.

Durban Regiment also supplied 13 members to the Reserve Force company that was deployed with 2 SAI deploying to the DRC in June 2005.

In June 2006, Durban Regiment supplied a Company HQ and a platoon to 5 SAI's contingent deployed to Burundi. In July 2007, Durban Regiment provided a mortar section to 5 SAI for another deployment to Burundi. In July 2008, Durban Regiment supplied a rifle platoon to 121 BN for the UN peace support operation to the DRC, MONUSCO.

Name change
In August 2019, 52 Reserve Force units had their names changed to reflect the diverse military history of South Africa. The Durban Regiment became the King Shaka Regiment, with three years to design and implement new regimental insignia.

Leadership

Insignia
The Durban Regiment badge consists of a silver fish eagle on a gold sea shell with the motto Punga Celeriter (Strike swiftly).

Previous dress insignia

Current dress insignia

Motto
 "" ("Strike swiftly")

References

Infantry regiments of South Africa
Military units and formations in Durban
Military units and formations established in 1960